Events in the year 2019 in Qatar.

Incumbents
 Emir: Tamim bin Hamad Al Thani

Events

Ongoing — Qatar diplomatic crisis
Ongoing — Qatar diplomatic crisis

16 April – The 2019 Qatari municipal elections.

27 September to 6 October – The 2019 World Athletics Championships were held in Doha.

12 to 16 October – The 2019 World Beach Games were held in Doha.

Deaths
2 June – Mahmoud Soufi, footballer (born 1971).

References

 

 
2010s in Qatar
Years of the 21st century in Qatar
Qatar
Qatar